Katunga is a closed railway station on the Goulburn Valley railway in the township of Katunga, Victoria, Australia. The station opened at the same time as the railway from Numurkah to Strathmerton on 1 October 1888. The station presently has a grain silo and loop siding.

References

Disused railway stations in Victoria (Australia)